ISO 3166-2:MX is the entry for Mexico in ISO 3166-2, part of the ISO 3166 standard published by the International Organization for Standardization (ISO), which defines codes for the names of the principal subdivisions (e.g., provinces or states) of all countries coded in ISO 3166-1.

Currently for Mexico, ISO 3166-2 codes are defined for 31 states and 1 federal entity. Mexico City has special status equal to the states.

Each code consists of two parts, separated by a hyphen. The second part is three letters.

Current codes
Subdivision names are listed as in the ISO 3166-2 standard published by the ISO 3166 Maintenance Agency (ISO 3166/MA).

Subdivision names are sorted in traditional Spanish alphabetical order: a-c, ch, d-l, ll, m-n, ñ, o-z.

Click on the button in the header to sort each column.

See also
 Subdivisions of Mexico
 FIPS region codes of Mexico

External links
 ISO Online Browsing Platform: MX
 States of Mexico, Statoids.com

2:MX
ISO 3166-2
Mexico geography-related lists